George S. Griggs (1805-1870) was a pioneer master mechanic in the earliest days of railroading in the United States.

Griggs, like other mechanics of his age, learned the art of machining at Locks and Canals Machine Shop.  In 1834 the Boston and Providence (B&P) railroad hired Griggs as their master mechanic, where he spent the remainder of his career.

1845 saw Griggs building his first locomotive, a 4-4-0 named Norfolk, at the railroad shops where he worked in Roxbury.  Griggs oversaw the construction of nearly twenty more locomotives that used designs and technology from Norfolk.

While employed at the railroad, Griggs filed several patents of his own design for items as varied as brake systems, driving wheels, and the firebrick arch.  His designs were so successful that the B&P continued building locomotives to his designs for a few years after his death in 1870.

See also
Taunton Locomotive Manufacturing Company

References

External links 
  - improved fire arch.

1805 births
1870 deaths
American railroad mechanical engineers
Locomotive builders and designers
American people in rail transportation
American railroad pioneers